Vera Ralston (born Věra Helena Hrubá; July 12, 1919 or 1920 or 1921 or 1923  February 9, 2003) was a Czech figure skater and actress. She later became a naturalized American citizen. She worked as an actress during the 1940s and 1950s.

Early life
Ralston was born Věra Helena Hrubá in Prague to a Catholic family with a home on the Berounka River. Her father, Rudolf Hrubý, was a jeweler. Her year of birth has been given as 1919, 1920, 1921, and 1923. Her brother, Rudy Ralston, later became a film producer in the United States.

Skating career
As a figure skater, she represented Czechoslovakia in competition under her birth name Věra Hrubá. She competed at the 1936 European Figure Skating Championships and placed 15th. Later that season, she competed at the 1936 Winter Olympics, where she placed 17th. During the games, she personally met and reportedly insulted Adolf Hitler. Hitler asked her if she would like to "skate for the swastika." As she later boasted, "I looked him right in the eye, and said that I'd rather skate on the swastika. The Führer was furious."

Hrubá competed at the 1937 European Figure Skating Championships and placed 7th. She emigrated to the United States in  1941 and became a naturalized citizen in 1946.

Results

Acting career

She moved to Hollywood with her mother and signed a contract in 1943 with Republic Pictures. During her career she was known as Vera Hrubá Ralston and Vera Hruba Ralston, and, later, simply as Vera Ralston. She normally played an immigrant girl, because of her limited English skills. Among the 26 films Ralston starred in were Storm Over Lisbon with Erich von Stroheim (1944), Dakota (1945) with John Wayne, I, Jane Doe (1948) with John Carroll and Ruth Hussey, The Fighting Kentuckian, also with Wayne (1949), A Perilous Journey with David Brian and Scott Brady (1953), and Fair Wind to Java with Fred MacMurray (1953). She retired from films in 1958. Reportedly only 2 of her 20 films made money.

In 1952, Ralston married Republic studio head Herbert Yates. Yates was nearly 40 years her senior, and reportedly left his wife, with whom he had two grown children, to be with Ralston. Yates used his position as the studio's head executive to obtain roles for Ralston; at one point he was sued by two studio shareholders for using company assets for his own gain by promoting his wife's career. It was alleged that 18 of her 20 films had been flops. Yates' and Vera's relatives were pushed out of Republic and the film business in 1959, the same year Republic's board decided to switch emphasis from film production to distribution. Yates died in 1966, leaving half of his estate ($8 million) to Ralston; she suffered a nervous breakdown shortly thereafter. Eventually, she remarried a businessman 11 years her junior and lived quietly in southern California. She died on February 9, 2003, in Santa Barbara, California, after a long battle with cancer. For her work in films, Ralston has a star in the Hollywood Walk of Fame.

Legacy
A registered Republican, she supported Dwight Eisenhower during the 1952 presidential election.

Filmography

References

External links

Ralston timeline
 

Year of birth uncertain
2003 deaths
American film actresses
American female single skaters
Czech female single skaters
Czechoslovak female single skaters
Czechoslovak emigrants to the United States
Olympic figure skaters of Czechoslovakia
Figure skaters at the 1936 Winter Olympics
American people of Bohemian descent
Figure skaters from Prague
Deaths from cancer in California
Actresses from Prague
20th-century American actresses
Naturalized citizens of the United States
California Republicans
Burials at Santa Barbara Cemetery
21st-century American women